Vice Reclaimed is a 1703 comedy play by Richard Wilkinson. It is also known by the longer title Vice Reclaim'd: Or, the Passionate Mistress.

It premiered at the Drury Lane Theatre included Benjamin Johnson as Sir Feeble Goodwill, Robert Wilks as Wilding, Joseph Williams as Gainlove, William Bullock as Fondle, Henry Norris as Ralph, Mary Kent as Widow Purelight, Jane Rogers as Annabella and Frances Maria Knight as Mrs Haughty, Jane Lucas as Malapert and Mary Powell as Mrs Rhenish.

References

Bibliography
 Burling, William J. A Checklist of New Plays and Entertainments on the London Stage, 1700-1737. Fairleigh Dickinson Univ Press, 1992.

1703 plays
English plays
Comedy plays
West End plays